The Neptune Factor, also known as The Neptune Disaster, is a 1973 science fiction film directed by Daniel Petrie, featuring underwater cinematography by Paul Herbermann. The film's special effects utilized underwater photography of miniatures with actual marine life.

Plot 
Marine scientists prepare to leave their underwater ocean lab after an extended stay performing oceanographic research. An underwater earthquake interrupts their plans. Dr. Andrews (Walter Pidgeon) enlists experimental sub captain Adrien Blake (Ben Gazzara) to survey the damage and rescue the oceanauts. He brings along chief diver "Mack" MacKay (Ernest Borgnine) and Dr. Leah Jansen (Yvette Mimieux), fiancée of one of the scientists.

Blake finds the lab has been ripped from its moorings and has tumbled down an unexplored, deep ocean trench, presumably intact. With the lab's reserve air supply dwindling, the team descends into the unexplored trench and finds an incredible ecosystem populated with monstrously oversized fish.

After surviving encounters with unfriendly denizens, they find the lab partially intact, the surviving scientists breathing from scuba tanks and fending off giant, hungry eels. Diver Moulton sacrifices his life distracting the eels in order to enable the others to be rescued. The submarine returns to the surface with the two rescued scientists.

Cast
Ben Gazzara – Commander Adrian Blake 
Yvette Mimieux – Dr. Leah Jansen 
Walter Pidgeon – Dr. Samuel Andrews 
Ernest Borgnine – Chief Diver Don MacKay 
Donnelly Rhodes – Diver Bob Cousins 
Chris Wiggins – Captain Williams 
Michael J. Reynolds – Dr. Hal Hamilton 
Leslie Carlson – Brigs, Triton Radioman
Stuart Gillard – Diver Phil Bradley
David Yorston – Diver Stephens

Production
Sandy Howard, a film producer from the United States, brought the idea of The Neptune Factor to David Perlmutter and Harold Greenberg, who chose to produce the film. Howard wanted the film to be made in the United States, but Greenberg was able to have the film shot in Canada. The film was based on an original story by writer Jack DeWitt. Gazzara and Borgnine's casting was announced in August 1972. The movie has a subtitle of "An Underwater Odyssey".

The film was shot from 25 September to 16 December 1972, on a budget of $2,500,000. The Canadian Film Development Corporation contributed $200,000 to the film's budget under the demand that Daniel Petrie be the director.

The nature of the Oceanlab underwater facility bears a resemblance to real-world projects of the 1960s such as the ConShelf Two project of Jacques Cousteau, NASA's NEEMO, and the US Navy SEALAB.

Release
The film was released on 26 June 1973, in Ottawa. The film premiered in Florida in May 1973 and grossed $203,000 in its first four days.

Reception
TV Guide gave the film one out of 5 stars, stating that while its underwater photography was well done, the film was predictable, the characters stereotypes and the story lacking. The New York Times also praised the photography, but found little else of value in the film.

See also
 List of American films of 1973
 Sealab 2020, a 1972 animated series about a futuristic underwater research base

References

Works cited

External links
 
 
 
 
 Entire film on YouTube
  – Discussion of the special effects techniques used in the film.

1973 films
1970s disaster films
1970s science fiction films
20th Century Fox films
Canadian disaster films
Canadian science fiction films
English-language Canadian films
Films scored by Lalo Schifrin
Films directed by Daniel Petrie
Films set in Nova Scotia
Films shot in the Cayman Islands
Science fiction submarine films
1970s English-language films
1970s Canadian films